"Die güldne Sonne voll Freud und Wonne" (The golden sun full of joy and delight) is a Lutheran hymn by Paul Gerhardt. It is a morning hymn which was first published in 1666, with a four-part setting by Johann Georg Ebeling. Gerhardt created an unusual hymn metre (5.5. 5.5. 10. 5.6. 5.6. 10.) for its 12 stanzas.

Among the hymn tunes for "Die güldne Sonne" is also one by Johann Anastasius Freylinghausen, which was published in 1708. This tune was included in Schemellis Gesangbuch of 1736, with an accompaniment attributed to Johann Sebastian Bach. Ebeling's melody remained the standard for the hymn, and with this tune it is included in the modern Protestant hymnal Evangelisches Gesangbuch, and other hymnals and songbooks.

Catherine Winkworth translated seven stanzas of the hymn into English ("The golden sunbeams with their joyous gleams", 1855), and Richard Massie six ("Evening and Morning", 1857). Full translations include those by John Kelly ("The golden morning", 1867) and Hermann Brueckner's "The sun ascending", 1918. Four stanzas of the hymn are included in the 2006 Lutheran Service Book.

Background and history 

Paul Gerhardt, the author of the text of "", was a pastor of the Nikolaikirche in the centre of Berlin from 1657. The church musician there, Johann Crüger, had held the office from 1622. In 1649, a year after the end of the Thirty Years' War, Crüger began publishing hymns by Gerhardt in his . By its 1661 edition, the hymnal contained 90 songs by Gerhardt.

Both Arndt and Gerhardt adhered to Orthodox Lutheranism, but considered religion primarily as a personal experience. Their writings are devotional, and can be regarded as step-stones towards Pietism. Gerhardt's "" follows Arndt's thoughts, inviting the reader to contemplate the beauty and blessings of God's creation. It is thought to have been written in the poet's mature years.

By then, the church musician at the Nikolaikirche was Johann Georg Ebeling who had succeeded Crüger when he died in 1662. In February 1666 Gerhardt had to step down as pastor of the Nikolaikirche. The same year, Ebeling started to publish hymns by Gerhardt hymns in a series called Pauli Gerhardi Geistliche Andachten. The first three volumes were printed by Erasmus Rösner in Frankfurt an der Oder. "" was first published in the third volume of Pauli Gerhardi Geistliche Andachten, with a four-part setting by Ebeling. It appeared under the header "Morgen-Segen" (Morning–blessing):

Further volumes of Ebeling's Pauli Gerhardi Geistliche Andachten were first published by Christoph Runge in Berlin. After the completion of the series in 1667, new editions of the entire collection in Berlin and other German cities soon followed. The collection comprises 120 hymns by Gerhardt, all with a musical setting provided by Ebeling, who had composed 112 original hymn tunes for them, including "".

Gerhardt's hymn has kept its presence in German hymnals and songbooks: in the 21st century it is available in dozens of these, which include collections of songs for children and young people, and collections for funerals.

Text 
Gerhardt's hymn is in twelve stanzas of ten lines. In a comparatively small number of his poems, Gerhardt used an unusual verse structure, in rhyme scheme and hymn metre. Half a dozen complicated stanza formats appear in Gerhardt's poetry, half of which, including the one he used for "Die güldne Sonne", are his own invention. This hymn's stanza format is:

According to Theodore Brown Hewitt's 1918 book about the influence of Gerhardt, this stanza format is neither harmonious nor artistic, but nonetheless very compatible with typical 17th-century melodies. A style characteristic of the poetry is the Baroque usage of twin formulas, or doublets of exact or approximate synonyms, such as "", sometimes with alliteration, e.g. "" or assonance, e.g. "".

Translations 
The 1907 Dictionary of Hymnology considered two versions of Gerhardt's hymn as being in common use:
 "The golden sunbeams with their joyous gleams", Catherine Winkworth's translation of stanzas 1–4, 8, 9 and 12, first published in 1855.
 "Evening and Morning", Richard Massie's translation of stanzas 4 and 8–12, first published in 1857.

Translations not in common use are, according to that dictionary:
 "The sun's golden beams" by Catherine Hannah Dunn (1857)
 "Sunbeams all golden" by Frances Elizabeth Cox (1864)
 "What is our mortal race" (beginning with stanza 7) by Edward Massie (1866)
 "See the sun's glorious light", also by E. Massie (1867)
 "The golden morning" by John Kelly (1867).

Herman Brueckner (1866–1942) translated the complete hymn, "The sun ascending", first published in 1918. The Lutheran Service Book, published in 2006, has four stanzas of the hymn, combining two in R. Massie's translation and two in Brueckner's translation. The Free Lutheran Chorale-Book website presents a composite hymn titled "The Golden Morning". It has the complete content in a version that can be sung to the hymn tune, which is based partly on the translations of Kelly, R. Massie and Cox.

Winkworth 

Winkworth's "The golden sunbeams with their joyous gleams", a translation of stanzas 1–4, 8, 9 and 12 of Gerhardt's hymn, was published in her Lyra Germanica of 1855. This translation follows the rhyme scheme of the original, but partially diverts from its metre. Kennedy's hymnal of 1863 retained stanzas 1, 3, 4 and 12 of Winkworth's translation. Winkworth's translation of the first stanza:

R. Massie 
R. Massie's "Evening and Morning", which follows the original metre throughout, is a singable English-language version. It translates stanzas 4 and 8—12 of Gerhardt's hymn, and was published in Mercer's Church Psalm & Hymn Book in 1857. It was adopted, in whole or in part, in several subsequent hymnals. One of these hymnals, James Martineau's Hymns of Praise and Prayer of 1876, has R. Massie's translation of stanzas 4, 9 and 12. R. Massie's translation of the fourth stanza:

Kelly 

Kelly published his translations of the 120 hymns in Pauli Gerhardi Geistliche Andachten in 1867. For each translation the metre of the original is followed. According to the Dictionary of Hymnology, Kelly renders Gerhardt's hymns faithfully. Kelly's translation of stanza 8:

Brueckner 
The 1930 American Lutheran Hymnal retained stanzas 1, 3, 5 and 12 of Brueckner's 1918 translation. The final stanza of Gerhardt's hymn, with Brueckner's translation:

Hymn tunes and settings 
The hymn metre of "Die güldne Sonne" lends itself most easily to a setting in a ternary rhythm. A 21st-century interpretation is that the triple metre of Ebeling's setting has the character of a galliard, a dance with a "light-footed" rhythm, which musically elevates the earth-heavy statements of Gerhardt's text.

Ebeling 
Ebeling published his four-part setting of "Die güldne Sonne" in G major. His melody for the hymn is catalogued as Zahn No. 8013. According to the Dictionary of Hymnology, where Ebeling's hymn tune is called a "beautiful melody", this tune is known under the name "Franconia" in Ireland. A hymn tune named "Philippi", for hymn texts in 6.6.4.6.6.6.4. metre, is derived from Ebeling's setting of "Die güldne Sonne". The German Protestant hymnal, Evangelisches Gesangbuch, includes "Die güldne Sonne" with Ebeling's melody as EG 449. In the 21st century, Gerhard Raßner provided a modern edition of Ebeling's four-part setting.

According to author Christa Kirschbaum, speaking in a 2016 WDR 3 broadcast on the hymn, Ebeling's melody follows the text of the first stanza, beginning high, like the sun, turning downward when "lying down" is mentioned, and rising again starting from "But now I stand". Kirschbaum thinks that Gerhardt and Ebeling, more than just depicting the rising of the sun, thus rather refer to the resurrection (Auferstehung) of Christ.

With Ebeling's tune, the hymn was recorded by Dieter Falk, by the Bachchor Siegen (conducted by Ulrich Stötzel), and by the Wilhelmshavener Vokalensemble (conducted by Ralf Popken). Instrumental settings of the hymn tune, mostly for organ, were composed by Hermann Paul Claußnitzer, Herbert Collum, Paul Manz, Lothar Graap, and others.

Hintze 
 published "Die güldne Sonne voll Freud und Wonne" with a different tune, Zahn No. 8014, in 1670. With this tune, the hymn was included in the Praxis pietatis melica, which was continued by Runge after Crüger's death, from its 1671 edition. Other hymnals mostly adopted the hymn with Ebeling's tune.

Freylinghausen / Bach 

Johann Anastasius Freylinghausen published another setting of the hymn in 1708. The melody is aria-like: Carl von Winterfeld, a 19th-century hymnologist, considers it to be among Freylinghausen's least dance-like hymn settings.

The Bach Gesellschaft published BWV 451 in 1893, and in the New Bach Edition it was published in 1991. The setting was recorded often, along with other songs from the collection, such as Peter Schreier and organist Karl Richter in 1978, Berthold Possemeyer and organist  in 1994, and a choral version in a live performance by the Thomanerchor conducted by Georg Christoph Biller in 2009.

Other settings
Two new melodies for the hymn were published in the 18th century (Zahn Nos. 8016 and 8017), and another in the first half of the 19th century (Zahn No. 8018a). The Zahn 8017 melody, composed by Johannes Schmidlin, appears in the Paul-Gerhardt-Chorbuch, published in 2006. J. Martineau's 1876 publication with R. Massie's translation of the hymn contains a new four-part setting for it (not in Zahn), by the publisher's brother Basil.

References

Further reading

External links 

 Evangelisches Gesangbuch 449 at 4Bibeln website

1653 works
17th-century hymns in German
Lutheran hymns
Hymns by Paul Gerhardt